Terry Hudson (birth unknown), also known by the nickname of "Tex", is a former professional rugby league footballer who played in the 1960s, 1970s and 1980s.

Playing career

Featherstone Rovers
Hudson made his début for Featherstone Rovers and scored a try in the victory over Castleford on Monday 7 April 1969, during his time at Featherstone Rovers he scored twenty-nine 3-point tries, and one 4-point try.

Hudson played as an substitute (replacing  David Hartley) in Featherstone Rovers' 9-12 defeat by Hull F.C. in the 1969 Yorkshire Cup Final during the 1969–70 season at Headingley, Leeds on Saturday 20 September 1969, and played  in the 7–23 defeat by Leeds in the 1970 Yorkshire Cup Final during the 1970–71 season at Odsal Stadium, Bradford on Saturday 21 November 1970.

Hull Kingston Rovers
In 1971, Hudson was transferred from Featherstone Rovers to Hull Kingston Rovers for a fee of £7,500.

In January 1973, Hudson represented Yorkshire while at Hull Kingston Rovers in a 20–7 win against Cumberland, helping the team retain the County Championship.

Return to Featherstone
In 1979, Hudson returned to Featherstone Rovers.

Hudson played , was the captain, and received a 10-minute sin-bin in Featherstone Rovers' 14-12 victory over Hull F.C. in the 1983 Challenge Cup Final during the 1982–83 season at Wembley Stadium, London on Saturday 7 May 1983, in front of a crowd of 84,969.

References

External links
Statistics at rugbyleagueproject.org
Terry Hudson
The Story of Wembley 1983. Part I - a featherstone rovers blog
The Story of Wembley 1983. Part II - a featherstone rovers blog
The Story of Wembley 1983. Part III - a featherstone rovers blog
The Story of Wembley 1983. Part IV - a featherstone rovers blog
The Story of Wembley 1983. Part V - a featherstone rovers blog
The Story of Wembley 1983. Part VI - a featherstone rovers blog
The Story of Wembley 1983. Part VII - a featherstone rovers blog
The Story of Wembley 1983. Part VIII - a featherstone rovers blog
The Story of Wembley 1983. Part IX - a featherstone rovers blog
The Story of Wembley 1983. Part X - a featherstone rovers blog

Living people
English rugby league players
Featherstone Rovers captains
Featherstone Rovers players
Hull Kingston Rovers players
Hunslet R.L.F.C. players
Rugby league halfbacks
Rugby league locks
Wakefield Trinity players
Yorkshire rugby league team players
Year of birth missing (living people)